John T. Cockerell was a collector of specimens for zoölogists, active in Australia sometime between 1865 and 1891.

In reviewing an outlying record of Purpureicephalus spurius (red-capped parrot) at Port Essington, repeated by John Gould and other ornithologists, Birds of Australia gave this caution on Cockerell's specimens.

The Handbook of the Birds of the World Alive 'Key to Scientific Names' notes possible biographical details as "(?1828-1907) Australian (?)", a middle name of Thomas, and places him in Hong Kong 1847 in a government position, commissariat storekeeper, also a soldier of fortune, seafarer and naturalist, who settled in Queensland about 1860.

His son, James F. Cockerell  (?1844-1897), followed in his father's occupation.

References 

19th-century births
Year of death missing
Zoological collectors